Albert Robida (14 May 1848 – 11 October 1926) was a French illustrator, etcher, lithographer, caricaturist, and novelist. He edited and published La Caricature magazine for 12 years. Through the 1880s, he wrote an acclaimed trilogy of futuristic novels. In the 1900s he created 520 illustrations for Pierre Giffard's weekly serial La Guerre Infernale.

Biography
He was born in Compiègne, France, the son of a carpenter. He studied to become a notary, but was more interested in caricature. In 1866 he joined Journal amusant as an illustrator. In 1880, with Georges Decaux, he founded his own magazine La Caricature, which he edited for 12 years. He illustrated tourist guides, works of popular history, and literary classics. His fame disappeared after World War I.

Robida and his wife Marguerite (née Noiret) had seven children, three of which made contributions to the arts. His elder son Camille became a well-known architect. His youngest son, Henry, had been tabbed to serve as consulting architect to the government of Siam (today Thailand), but his life was cut short by World War I. Daughter Émilie was also an illustrator. In addition to several collaborations with her father, she was published in periodicals such as Le Journal pour tous and La Poupée modèle. Another son, Frédéric, was a president of the Touring Club de France.

École primaire Albert Robida, a school in his native Compiègne, is named in his honor.

Futuristic Trilogy
Albert Robida was rediscovered thanks to his trilogy of futuristic works:
Le Vingtième Siècle (1883)
La Guerre au vingtième siècle (1887)
Le Vingtième siècle. La vie électrique (1890)

These works drew comparison with Jules Verne. Unlike Verne, he proposed inventions integrated into everyday life, not creations of mad scientists, and he imagined the social developments that arose from them, often with accuracy: social advancement of women, mass tourism, pollution, etc. His La Guerre au vingtième siècle describes modern warfare, with robotic missiles and poison gas. His Téléphonoscope was a flat screen television display that delivered the latest news 24-hours a day, the latest plays, courses, and teleconferences.

Works with Pierre Giffard

Robida illustrated two works by Pierre Giffard:
 La Fin du Cheval ("The End of the Horse"), on the inevitable replacement of the horse by the bicycle and then by the car.
 La Guerre Infernale ("The Infernal War"), a 1908 serial adventure novel for children that appeared weekly every Saturday. Robida contributed 520 illustrations. The novel is set in the future and features uncanny parallels to World War Two, including an attack on London by Germany and a conflict between Japan and the United States. It was subsequently republished as a book.

Bibliography
Futuristic

 Voyages très extraordinaires de Saturnin Farandoul, 1879 (translated by Brian Stableford as The Adventures of Saturnin Farandoul)
 Le Vingtième Siècle, 1883 (translated by Phillipe Willems as The Twentieth Century)
 La Guerre au vingtième siècle, 1887
 Le Vingtième Siècle. La vie électrique, 1890 (translated by Brian Stableford as Electric Life)
 Voyage de fiançailles au XXe siècle
 Un chalet dans les airs (translated by Brian Stableford as Chalet in the Sky)
 L'horloge des siècles, 1902 (translated by Brian Stableford as The Clock of the Centuries )
 L'Ingénieur von Satanas, 1919
Other work
 L'Île de Lutèce : enlaidissements et embellissements de la Cité La Bête au bois dormant La Part du hasard Le Voyage de M. Dumollet Les Vieilles Villes d'Italie : notes et souvenirs La Grande Mascarade parisienne La Fin des Livres, with Octave Uzanne
 Contes pour les bibliophiles, with Octave Uzanne
 Les Vieilles Villes d'Espagne, notes et souvenirs Un caricaturiste prophète. La guerre telle qu'elle est 1430, les assiégés de Compiègne Paris de siècle en siècle; le cœur de Paris, splendeurs et souvenir Le 19e siècle Les Escholiers du temps jadis Les Vieilles Villes d'Italie : notes et souvenirs Le Voyage de M. DumolletLa Vieille France series
 La Bretagne, text, drawings and 40 additional lithographies hors by A. Robida, Paris, Librairie illustrée, ca. 1900, 336 p.
 La Touraine, text, drawings and lithography by A. Robida, Paris, La Librairie Illustrée, 336 p., 40 illustrations, undated [1892]. Tome II: Le Mans, Laval, Sablé, Angers, Saumur, Thouars, Loudun, Chinon, Vendôme
 Normandie, text, drawings and lithographies by A. Robida, Paris, La Librairie illustrée, undated [1890], 331 pages, 40 additional duotone illustrations. Tome II: Bayeux, Lisieux, Bernay, Honfleur, Le Havre, Fécamp, Dieppe, Eu, Rouen, Louviers, Évreux, Vernon. Republished: Éd. de Crémille, Genève, 1994, 169 p.
 Provence, Paris, À la Librairie illustrée, undated [1893], 332 p. Avignon, Barbentane, Orange, Carpentras, Vaucluse, Cavaillon, Sisteron, Tarascon, Beaucaire, Arles, Marseille, Toulon, Fréjus, Nice, Monaco, Menton, Aix, Nîmes, Uzès, Montpellier, Béziers, Narbonne, Carcassonne
 Paris, Splendeurs et Souvenirs, Éditions de Crémille, Genève, 1992, textes, dessins et lithographies par A. Robida, 824 p., 2 volumes. Tome 1 : Le Cœur de Paris, 412 p. Tome 2 : Paris, de Siècle en Siècle, 412 p.

 Notes 

Critical studies
 Elizabeth Emery, "Albert Robida, Medieval Publicist," in: Cahier Calin: Makers of the Middle Ages. Essays in Honor of William Calin '', ed. Richard Utz and Elizabeth Emery (Kalamazoo, MI: Studies in Medievalism, 2011), pp. 51–55.

External links

 
 Albert Robida... et son blog 
 'French Medieval Tales in the 19th Century', British Library blog
 The friends of Albert Robida site 
 1942 Life magazine article on accuracy of Robida's predictions of future warfare, with pictures
 
 
 

1848 births
1926 deaths
People from Compiègne
French science fiction writers
French speculative fiction artists
French illustrators
French caricaturists
Writers from Hauts-de-France
19th-century French novelists
French male novelists
19th-century French male writers